Uroš Vemić (Serbian Cyrillic: Уpoш Beмић; born 22 January 1987, in Belgrade) is a Serbian-born Montenegrin retired footballer who last played in Srpska Liga Belgrade club FK Kovačevac.

Club career
He has previously played in Serbian SuperLiga clubs FK Zemun and FK Jagodina, also Second league clubs FK Jedinstvo Surčin, FK Radnički Jugopetrol and FK Mladost Lučani beside Montenegrin clubs FK Budućnost Podgorica and FK Kom.

External sources
 Profile at Srbijafudbal.
 Current season stats at 90minuta.

1987 births
Living people
Footballers from Belgrade
Association football forwards
Serbia and Montenegro footballers
Montenegrin footballers
FK Zemun players
FK Jedinstvo Surčin players
FK Radnički Beograd players
FK Bokelj players
FK Jagodina players
FK Mladost Lučani players
FK Kom players
FK Kovačevac players
First League of Serbia and Montenegro players
Second League of Serbia and Montenegro players
Montenegrin First League players
Serbian SuperLiga players
Serbian First League players
Montenegrin expatriate footballers